The Sony Cybershot DSC-F717 is a bridge digital camera, introduced by Sony in September 2002.

Overview
F717 features the same 5.0 megapixel CCD sensor and 38–190 mm equiv. Carl Zeiss Vario-Sonnar lens as its predecessor, the 2001 DSC-F707. Major changes / improvements over the F707 include:

 Analog focus ring can now double as a zoom ring
 Addition of a "P" mode, ISO 800 option, and (with constraints) 1/2000 shutter speed
 Better Noise Reduction Algorithm; NR automatically applies for slower than 1/30 shots
 More natural color rendition (in particular, less "red overshoot")
 Quick Review: The last photo can be reviewed by holding on the shutter button after the photo is taken.
 USB 2.0 for faster file transfer to a PC or a printer
 Supports Memory Stick Pro with capacity of 256MB and up (original Memory Stick has a maximum capacity of 128MB per side)

F717 retained all distinctive features from F707, such as:

Swivel body design: the lens can be rotated from 36 degrees down to 77 degrees up.
Hologram AF Assist: projects a laser grid to help acquire AF lock in low-light environments.
NightShot and NightFraming: In these modes, infrared cut-off filter is temporarily lifted away from CCD, enabling IR detection, which practically allows the camera to "see in the dark". Two infrared LEDs provide short-range active IR illumination in both Night modes. In NightShot mode, Aperture and shutter parameters are forced to "auto", because of potential "see through clothing" concerns.
 LCD/EVF switchable via a hard switch on the back

The F717 was succeeded by DSC-F828 in August 2003.

Defective batches
Some very early production units may experience inaccurate focus with Laser Hologram on. Sony admitted the problem as a minor design flaw, and offered free examination and repair service. Serial numbers of potentially affected units were also announced. According to Sony, it is fixable by correcting a wrong parameter with Sony factory adjustment software. The fix was only performed at Sony service centers.

Around 2004–05, many F717 users reported CCD-related defects. It was later confirmed that many Sony CCDs made from late 2002 to early 2004 suffer from a large-scale manufacturing defect. Interestingly, the aforementioned first-run units seem to be immune to this failure, as they used CCDs built from old production techniques. As a remedy, Sony offered free CCD replacements for affected units till 2007, and in some countries, till 2010. This recall would cover units with expired warranty.

References

 DP Review

F717
Bridge digital cameras
Cameras introduced in 2002